National Route 287 is a national highway of Japan connecting Yonezawa, Yamagata and Higashine, Yamagata in Japan, with a total length of 82 km (50.95 mi).

References

National highways in Japan
Roads in Yamagata Prefecture